1,000 Dollars a Minute is a 1935 American comedy film directed by Aubrey Scotto and starring Roger Pryor and Leila Hyams. The film was released on October 22, 1935. The film was nominated for an Academy Award in the category Sound Recording.

Plot
A broken and pennyless newspaperman takes part in an experiment where two crazy millionaires are offering a prize of $10,000 to anyone that can spend $1,000 a minute, every minute, for 12 hours straight.

Cast
 Roger Pryor as Wally Jones
 Leila Hyams as Dorothy Summers
 Edward Brophy as Benny Dolan
 Sterling Holloway as Pete
 Edgar Kennedy as Police Officer McCarthy
 Purnell Pratt as Charlie, the Editor
 Herman Bing as Vanderbrocken
 Arthur Hoyt as Jewel clerk
 William Austin as Salesman
 Franklin Pangborn as Reville
 George Hayes as New Deal Watson 
 Morgan Wallace as Big Jim Bradley
 Claude King as Robinson

References

External links
 
 

1935 films
1935 comedy films
1930s English-language films
American comedy films
American black-and-white films
Films directed by Aubrey Scotto
Films produced by Nat Levine
Republic Pictures films
1930s American films